Kingston Stockade Football Club is an American soccer team based in Kingston, New York. The team was founded in November 2015, and began its first season in May 2016. The team's usual home is Dietz Stadium in Kingston, however the team will be playing the 2023 season at Tenney Stadium in Poughkeepsie due to ongoing renovations at Dietz.

The team plays in the National Premier Soccer League (NPSL), a national semi-professional league at the fourth tier of the American Soccer Pyramid. The team competes in the North Atlantic conference of the NPSL's Northeast region.

History 
In February 2016, George Vizvary was named head coach, Rory Becker was named assistant coach, and Chuck Wilder was named goalkeeper coach for the club's inaugural season. Dan Hoffay and Nick Hoffay were named the club's lead scouts.

In January 2017, management announced that David Lindholm, a coach for Bard College's soccer team, would replace Vizvary as the new head of the coaching staff. In February of the same year, Lindholm announced his coaching staff. Rory Becker and Charles Wilder will continue as assistant coach and goalkeeper coach respectively. Newcomer Ben Walsh will serve as a second assistant coach to Lindholm.

The team is named after the stockade fortification that protected the original Dutch settlement of Kingston back in the 1600s. Dietz Stadium is a short walk from the historic Kingston Stockade District. The stockade fortification is also referenced in the team's crest. The name of the team's first supporters group, Dutch Guard, is also a reference to this historical period.

In its second season, the team qualified for its first playoff match finishing at the top of the table. It played in the conference final against Hartford City FC on July 15. After regular time, the score was 1–1, and the game went into overtime. Michael Creswick scored the winning goal in the 94th minute, giving Stockade its first ever conference championship. On May 9, 2018, it played its first U.S. Open Cup game against the Long Island Rough Riders losing 6–3. On September 18, the club announced that head coach Lindholm stepped down from his position, citing "work in the athletic department at Bard College required his full dedication" with former captain, Jamal Lis-Simmons, named head coach on September 24, 2018.

Record

Year-by-year

Personnel

Dan Hoffay was named Technical Director of Stockade FC on September 20, 2018 replacing departing general manager Randy Kim in that role. He had previously served as the team's player personnel director. Nick Hoffay was promoted to Director of Scouting on October 4, 2018 having previously served as the team's head scout. Dennis Crowley has served as chairman of Stockade FC since its founding in 2016.

Jamal Lis-Simmons was hired as the 3rd head coach of Stockade FC on September 24, 2018. Lis-Simmons previously played for Stockade FC serving as captain since 2016. He replaced David Lindholm who stepped down from the club at the conclusion of the 2018 season. Lindholm served as coach for the 2017 and 2018 seasons, winning the NPSL Atlantic-White Conference in 2017. His predecessor was George Vizvary who coached one season with the team.

All-time top scorers 

Active players are marked in bold text.

References

External links
 

Men's soccer clubs in New York (state)
National Premier Soccer League teams
2016 establishments in New York (state)
Association football clubs established in 2016
Kingston, New York